Droop Hill is a mountain landform in the Kincardine and Mearns region of Aberdeenshire, Scotland.  The locale had been featured in a windfarm proposal submitted to the Aberdeenshire Council.

See also
Drumtochty Castle
Glenbervie

References

 United Kingdom Ordnance Survey Map Landranger 45, Stonehaven and Banchory, 1:50,000 scale, 2004
 Droop Hill wind farm proposal (2006) APP/2006/3278, Aberdeenshire Council

Line notes

Mountains and hills of Aberdeenshire